Paraleprodera diophthalma is a species of beetle in the family Cerambycidae. It was described by Francis Polkinghorne Pascoe in 1857. It is known from Taiwan and China.

Subspecies
 Paraleprodera diophthalma diophthalma (Pascoe, 1857)
 Paraleprodera diophthalma formosana (Schwarzer, 1925)

References

Lamiini
Beetles described in 1857